Ponte a Bozzone is a village in Tuscany, central Italy, administratively a frazione of the comune of Castelnuovo Berardenga, province of Siena. At the time of the 2001 census its population was 630.

Ponte a Bozzone is about 8 km from Siena and 17 km from Castelnuovo Berardenga.

References 

Frazioni of Castelnuovo Berardenga